The 1690s decade ran from January 1, 1690, to December 31, 1699.

References